A  serious game or applied game is a game designed for a primary purpose other than pure entertainment. The "serious" adjective is generally prepended to refer to video games used by industries like defense, education, scientific exploration, health care, emergency management, city planning, engineering, politics and art. Serious games are a subgenre of serious storytelling, where storytelling is applied "outside the context of entertainment, where the narration progresses as a sequence of patterns impressive in quality ... and is part of a thoughtful progress". The idea shares aspects with simulation generally, including flight simulation and medical simulation, but explicitly emphasizes the added pedagogical value of fun and competition.

History
The use of games in educational circles has been practiced since at least the twentieth century. Use of paper-based educational games became popular in the 1960s and 1970s, but waned under the Back to Basics teaching movement. (The Back to Basics teaching movement is a change in teaching style that started in the 1970s after student scores declined on standardized tests and students were alleged to be exploring too many electives. This movement wanted to focus students on reading, writing and arithmetic and intensify the curriculum.) Clark C. Abt is credited for coining the term "serious games" in the 1970s, defined as games that have an "explicit and carefully thought-out educational purpose and are not intended to be played primarily for amusement." Abt also recognized that this "does not mean that serious games are not, or should not be, entertaining."

The early 2000s saw a surge in different types of educational games, especially those designed for the younger learner. Many of these games were not computer-based but took on the model of other traditional gaming systems both in the console and hand-held formats. In 1999, LeapFrog Enterprises introduced the LeapPad, which combined an interactive book with a cartridge and allowed kids to play games and interact with a paper-based book. Based on the popularity of traditional hand-held gaming systems like Nintendo's Game Boy, they also introduced their hand-held gaming system called the Leapster in 2003. This system was cartridge-based and integrated arcade–style games with educational content.

Also in the 2000s, educational games saw an expanse into sustainable development with titles such as Learning Sustainable Development in 2000 and Climate Challenge in 2006.

Other directions for serious video games beyond education began to emerge in the early 2000s, with America's Army in 2002 as an early example. The game was a first-person shooter developed by the United States Army as a recruitment tool, and later used as an early training tool for new recruits.

By 2010, serious games had evolved to incorporate actual economies like Second Life, in which users can create actual businesses that provide virtual commodities and services for Linden dollars, which are exchangeable for US currency. In 2015, Project Discovery was launched as a serious game. Project Discovery was launched as a vehicle by which geneticists and astronomers with the University of Geneva could access the cataloging efforts of the gaming public via a mini-game contained within the Eve Online massively multiplayer online role-playing game (MMORPG). Players acting as citizen scientists categorize and assess actual genetic samples or astronomical data. This data was then utilized and warehoused by researchers. Any data flagged as atypical was further investigated by scientists.

Applications

Health 
On the one hand, the health sector includes digital games for the professional area of doctor training, e.g. to train an operation or to impart specialist knowledge, and on the other hand they address the private end user who uses them, for example, as motivation tools for a healthier lifestyle, nutrition or for rehabilitation purposes. In addition, Serious Games can be used as a training measure for patients who acquire knowledge about their clinical pictures and possible therapy options. There is also an increasing use of serious games in health education programs.

On 15 June 2020, the Food and Drug Administration approved the first video game treatment, a game for children aged 8–12 with certain types of ADHD called EndeavorRx. It can be downloaded with a prescription onto a mobile device, and is intended for use in tandem with other treatments. Patients play it for 30 minutes a day, 5 days a week, over a month-long treatment plan.

Scientific tool 

In 2021, Heather R. Campbell, a graduate student at the University of Kentucky, published her doctoral dissertation, Towards a Holistic Risk Model For Safeguarding the Pharmaceutical Supply Chain: Capturing the Human-Induced Risk to Drug Quality. In this work, Campbell developed a virtual pharmaceutical manufacturing plant and used the flexibility of video games to develop various real-life scenarios. The scenarios were then played by humans under different motivating objectives through a series of experiments. The results allowed Campbell to gather useful information on what might be the next threat to the pharmaceutical supply chain. The results showed promise for video games' future as a scientific data collection tool and was featured in a Bloomberg Prognosis Article.

Exercise therapy 

These include serious games that animate the player to sport and movement. For example, hand-eye coordination and upper body muscles can be trained using Wii Sports, regardless of age and physical disabilities, alone or with others. Even simple Jump-'n'-Run games can have an educational purpose, depending on the user. They are partly used in rehabilitation therapies to restore the user's finger mobility, reaction speed and eye-finger coordination.

Politics, culture and advertising 

Persuasive games are developed for advertisers, policy makers, news organizations and cultural institutions. They are politically and socially motivated games that serve social communication. They cover areas such as politics, religion, environment, urban planning and tourism. The aim is to lead to create a demand for product due to a generated positive exposure to the product in the game or introduce new ways of thinking through experience.

Security 
Serious games in the field of security are aimed at disaster control, the defense sector and recruitment. Public, private and municipal institutions, such as fire brigades, police, Federal Agency for Technical Relief (Technisches Hilfswerk - Germany THW), DRK as well as crisis centres and NGOs benefit from them. Scenarios such as natural disasters, acts of terrorism, danger prevention and emergency care are simulated. Challenges such as acting under time and pressure to succeed can thus be realistically tested with fewer resources and costs. This area formed the second focal point. An example of serious games from this sector is the Emergency game series or the possibility to explore the response of communities in a game in disaster management. Psychological effect that exist in real life-threatening situation are not realistic in a  serious game but the training in a serious game and exposure to the requirements and constraints in disaster management can prepare to a better response of the teams in a real disaster management case and lead to an improved risk mitigation strategies.

Military games 
Games like America's Army are training simulations that are used in the training and recruitment of soldiers. The games try to represent warfare as realistically as possible in order to familiarize users with the dangers, strategies, weapons, tactics and vehicles.

Recruitment games 
This type of serious games is intended to bring the user closer to tasks that would otherwise be less in the limelight. Companies try to present and profile themselves through such games in order to attract apprentices and applicants. Future tasks will be presented and carried out in a large context, for example "TechForce", in which various technical areas are combined into an end product with the aim of winning a race.

Product creation games 
The aim here is to give the user an understanding of a company's products. The user can test the products in a simulation under real conditions and convince themselves of their functionality. Technical basics, handling and security risks can be taught to the user.

Adult education 
Real simulations and simulation games provide the user with the opportunity to gain experience. Actions generated from knowledge can be tested here according to the  trial and error principle. Theoretical knowledge can either be acquired beforehand or imparted during the game, which can then be tested in a virtual practice. There is an educational policy interest in the professionalisation of such offers. With the research project NetEnquiry, the Federal Ministry of Education and Research supports a corresponding research project for education and training, implemented here with the focus on mobile learning. In addition, there is an increasing incorporation of serious games within university curricula which students can use to consolidate learning or enhance knowledge.

The News Game, with 100 headlines and stories, you guess if real or fake news, testing deduction and current affairs knowledge.

Youth education 
The user is given tasks and missions that they can only solve with the knowledge that they will gradually discover during the game. The theoretical aspects of the game are always taught in small quantities at the right time to be able to solve the next task and thus test the theoretical approaches in practice.

Art games 
An art game uses the medium of computer games to create interactive and multimedia art. For the first time, the term was described scientifically in 2002 to emphasize games that attach more importance to art than to game mechanics. Mostly they convince by a special aesthetics and atmosphere and use the interactivity for creativity and the thought stimulation of the player. Art created by or through computer games are also called art games.

See also

 Brain fitness
 Business game
 Business simulation game
 Educational video game
 Edutainment
 Games and learning
 Game with a purpose
 Games for Change
 Gamification
 Gamification of learning
 Global warming game
 Innovation game
 Intelligent tutoring system
 International Simulation and Gaming Association
 Learning objects
 Lego Serious Play
 List of educational video games
 Reacting games
 Serious Games Showcase and Challenge
 Serious play
 State of Play (conference series)
 Technology and mental health issues
 Transreality gaming

References

Further reading
Joy e as Letrinhas: um Serious Game como ferramenta de auxílio no processo de alfabetização de crianças do ensino fundamental.
Abt, C. (1970). Serious Games. New York: The Viking Press.

Egenfeldt-Nielsen, Simon. The basic learning approach behind Serious Games. April 2005 
Egenfeldt-Nielsen, Simon. Overview of research on the educational use of video games. March 2006

Lang, F., Pueschel, T. and Neumann, D. (2009). "Serious Gaming for the Evaluation of Market Mechanisms", Proceedings of the International Conference on Information Systems (ICIS) 2009.

 Reeves, Byron; Reed, J. Leighton (2009). Total Engagement: Using Games and Virtual Worlds to Change the Way People Work and Businesses Compete. Boston: Harvard Business School Publishing.
Routledge, Helen (2015). "Why Games Are Good For Business: How to Leverage the Power of Serious Games, Gamification and Simulations". Palgrave Macmillan.  

The International Journal on Serious Games, a scientific Open Access Journal, first issue January 2014.
Thompson D, Baranowski T, Buday R et al. Serious Video Games for Health: How Behavioral Science Guided the Development of a Serious Video Game. Simulation Gaming August 2010 vol. 41 no. 4 587–606.

Serious game
Health and video gaming
Political video games
Science and culture
The arts and politics
Video game types